Vlerick Business School ("Vlerick") is a Belgian business school with campuses in Ghent, Leuven and Brussels. It is a result of a merger of the MBA programmes of the Katholieke Universiteit Leuven and of the Instituut Professor Vlerick voor Management of Ghent University, in 1999. It is a higher education institute recognized and subsidized by decree.

History 
In 1953, professor, politician and entrepreneur André Vlerick founded the Centre for Productivity Studies and Research at State University of Ghent, which in 1983 becomes an autonomous school called the Instituut Professor Vlerick voor Management.

In 1968, the Catholic University of Leuven created an international MBA programme, later organised by the Katholieke Universiteit Leuven.

In 1999, both universities merge their MBA programme, creating a new institution named Vlerick Leuven Gent Management School and established in Leuven and Ghent. In parallel, the UGent and KU Leuven continue to offer graduate courses in management and business administration in their faculties of Management and Business administration.

In 2006, Vlerick opened its campus in Saint Petersburg, and in 2013 its Brussels campus, in Saint-Josse-ten-Noode.

In 2012, Vlerick Leuven Gent Management School changes its name and becomes the Vlerick Business School.

Vlerick presents itself as being the oldest business school in Europe though in 2018, it is legally speaking the most recent one founded in Belgium.

Building 
The building of its Ghent campus since 2007 was built in 1905 by Mgr Antoon Stillemans, as the major seminary of the Ghent diocese. The diocese then sold the building to the province.

Organisation 
Vlerick has three campuses in Belgium: Saint-Josse-ten-Noode (Brussels), Ghent and Leuven. The campuses are made up of an independent building or, in Brussels, classrooms located on a building floor. Other campuses abroad have been opened for limited periods of time: a campus in Saint Petersburg (Russia) opened in 2013 and closed again in 2019. Vlerick also has a cooperative program with BiMBA of Peking University's China Center for Economic Research in Beijing (China).

Vlerick offers MBA & Masters in Management, as well as general and specialized courses for managers, and custom-designed training for individual companies. Over 23,000 alumni in more than 100 different countries are alumni of the management schools. In 2015, Vlerick MBA Program was ranked top 100 MBA Programs and Top 10 MBA Program in Entrepreneurship worldwide by Financial Times.

Accreditation
Vlerick Business School holds three international accreditations: the American AACSB, the British AMBA, and the European EQUIS.

Vlerick is a higher education institute which is recognized and subsidized by decree.

Ranking
Vlerick ranks high amongst international and European business schools:
 The Economist magazine ranked Vlerick number 47 among global full-time MBA in 2010.
 Financial Times ranked Vlerick number 15 amongst European business schools in 2015.
 The MBA program ranked number 100 out of all global MBA programs in 2014 according to the Financial Times.
 The EMBA program ranked number 82 amongst global EMBA programs in 2018 according to the Financial Times.
 The Masters in Management program ranked number 29 among global programs in 2013 according to the Financial Times.
 The Masters in Financial management program ranked number 26th worldwide in 2018 according to the Financial Times.
The Masters in Marketing program ranked number 9th worldwide in 2019 according to the QS World University Rankings.

Notable alumni

 Bob Claes, general manager of Standard de Liège
 Frank Donck, director at KBC Bank
 Frank Meysman, Chairman of Thomas Cook Group plc.
 Kris Peeters, politician and vice-president of the European Investment Bank
 Marc Coucke, co-founder of Omega Pharma
 Marion Debruyne, Dean of Vlerick Business School
 Michel Moortgat, CEO of Duvel Moortgat NV
 Paul Bulcke, former CEO of Nestlé
 Philippe Delva, CEO of Global Commercial Banking Fortis
 Rudy Provoost, CEO of Rexel

References

External links
 
 
 More information about higher education in Flanders/Belgium (in English)
 Find an officially recognized program of this institution in the Higher Education Register
 Beijing International MBA

Business schools in Belgium
 
Universities and colleges formed by merger in Belgium